Crenitis is a genus of water scavenger beetles in the family Hydrophilidae. There are about 19 described species in Crenitis.

Species
These 19 species belong to the genus Crenitis:

 Crenitis aduncata
 Crenitis alticola (Fall, 1924)
 Crenitis apicalis Reitter, 1896
 Crenitis convexa Ji & Komarek, 2003
 Crenitis digesta (LeConte, 1855)
 Crenitis dissimilis (Horn, 1873)
 Crenitis formosana Hebauer, 1994
 Crenitis lianggeqiui
 Crenitis longula (Fall, 1924)
 Crenitis maculifrons Brown, 1940
 Crenitis malkini Miller, 1965
 Crenitis monticola (Horn, 1890)
 Crenitis morata (Horn, 1890)
 Crenitis obovata
 Crenitis palpalis Miller, 1965
 Crenitis paradigma (Orchymont, 1942)
 Crenitis rufiventris (Horn, 1873)
 Crenitis satoi Hebauer, 1994
 Crenitis snoqualmie Miller, 1965

References

Further reading

 

Hydrophilinae
Articles created by Qbugbot